The Lake-Porter County Conference was an IHSAA-sanctioned conference in Northwest Indiana. The conference formed by 1929 at latest, consisting of smaller schools in Lake and Porter counties (before suburban growth made many of these schools some of the largest in the state). The much smaller rural Porter County schools split off in 1933, though Portage and Wheeler would compete in both the LPCC and Porter County Conference. The conference ended in 1949, as almost every school would form the Calumet Athletic Conference.

Membership

 Played concurrently in the LPCC and PCC 1933-49.

References

Indiana High School Athletic Association disestablished conferences